Redemption: The Myth of Pet Overpopulation and the No Kill Revolution in America is a book by author Nathan Winograd.

The book has received reviews from Choice Online and the Library Journal.

References 

2007 non-fiction books